Harlan Cohen (November 6, 1934 – March 19, 2020) was an American volleyball coach who led both the United States men's and women's national teams during the mid-1960s. 

As a player, Cohen was a member of Team USA's volleyball team at the 1965 Maccabiah Games in Israel, along with Gene Selznick, who had played on world championship teams.

Cohen coached the men in 1966. He coached the women to a gold medal at the 1967 Pan American Games and a silver medal at the 1967 World Championships in Tokyo. He was head coach of the USA women's team for the 1968 Summer Olympics in Mexico City.

Cohen coached at Santa Monica College alongside Burt DeGroot from 1961 to 1972. Their teams won seven USA Volleyball (USVBA) college championships. He later was the head coach at Pepperdine University from 1975 to 1976 where his team won the USVBA championship in 1975.

Recognition
In 1990 he was inducted into the Southern California Jewish Sports Hall of Fame.
 Cohen received the George J. Fisher Leader in Volleyball Award from USA Volleyball in 1999.
 In 2000, he was awarded an All-Time Great Volleyball Coach Award from USA Volleyball.

References

Sources
 
 
  Biography at the Southern California Jewish Sports Hall of Fame

1934 births
2020 deaths
American volleyball coaches
Pepperdine Waves men's volleyball coaches
Volleyball players at the 1963 Pan American Games
American men's volleyball players
Maccabiah Games competitors for the United States
Maccabiah Games competitors by sport
Competitors at the 1957 Maccabiah Games
Pan American Games silver medalists for the United States
Pan American Games medalists in volleyball
Santa Monica Corsairs coaches
UCLA Bruins coaches
Sportspeople from Los Angeles
American Olympic coaches
Medalists at the 1963 Pan American Games
Volleyball players from Los Angeles
UCLA Bruins men's volleyball coaches